Mughal painting is a style of painting on paper confined to miniatures either as book illustrations or as single works to be kept in albums (muraqqa), from the territory of the Mughal Empire in South Asia. It emerged from Persian miniature painting (itself partly of Chinese origin) and developed in the court of the Mughal Empire of the 16th to 18th centuries. Battles, legendary stories, hunting scenes, wildlife, royal life, mythology, as well as other subjects have all been frequently depicted in paintings. 

The Mughal emperors were Muslims and they are credited with consolidating Islam in South Asia, and spreading Muslim (and particularly Persian) arts and culture as well as the faith.

Mughal painting immediately took a much greater interest in realistic portraiture than was typical of Persian miniatures. Animals and plants were the main subject of many miniatures for albums, and were more realistically depicted. Although many classic works of Persian literature continued to be illustrated, as well as Indian works, the taste of the Mughal emperors for writing memoirs or diaries, begun by Babur, provided some of the most lavishly decorated texts, such as the Padshahnama genre of official histories. Subjects are rich in variety and include portraits, events and scenes from court life, wild life and hunting scenes, and illustrations of battles. The Persian tradition of richly decorated borders framing the central image (mostly trimmed in the images shown here) was continued, as was a modified form of the Persian convention of an elevated viewpoint.

The Mughal painting style later spread to other Indian courts, both Muslim and Hindu, and later Sikh, and was often used to depict Hindu subjects. This was mostly in northern India. It developed many regional styles in these courts, tending to become bolder but less refined. These are often described as "post-Mughal", "sub-Mughal" or "provincial Mughal". The mingling of foreign Persian and indigenous Indian elements was a continuation of the patronage of other aspects of foreign culture as initiated by the earlier Turko-Afghan Delhi Sultanate, and the introduction of it into the subcontinent by various Central Asian Turkish dynasties?, such as the Ghaznavids.

Subjects

Portraits

From fairly early the Mughal style made a strong feature of realistic portraiture, normally in profile, and influenced by Western prints, which were available at the Mughal court. This had never been a feature of either Persian miniature or earlier Indian painting. The pose, rarely varied in portraits, was to have the head in strict profile, but the rest of the body half turned towards the viewer. For a long time portraits were always of men, often accompanied by generalized female servants or concubines; but there is scholarly debate about the representation of female court members in portraiture. Some scholars claim there are no known extant likenesses of figures like Jahanara Begum and Mumtaz Mahal, and others attribute miniatures, for example from the Dara Shikoh album or the Freer Gallery of Art mirror portrait, to these famous noblewomen. The single idealized figure of the Riza Abbasi type was less popular, but fully painted scenes of lovers in a palace setting became popular later. Drawings of genre scenes, especially showing holy men, whether Muslim or Hindu, were also popular.

Akbar had an album, now dispersed, consisting entirely of portraits of figures at his enormous court which had a practical purpose; according to chroniclers he used to consult it when discussing appointments and the like with his advisors, apparently to jog his memory of who the people being discussed were. Many of them, like medieval European images of saints, carried objects associated with them to help identification, but otherwise the figures stand on a plain background. There are a number of fine portraits of Akbar, but it was under his successors Jahangir and Shah Jahan that the portrait of the ruler became firmly established as a leading subject in Indian miniature painting, which was to spread to both Muslim and Hindu princely courts across India.

From the 17th century equestrian portraits, mostly of rulers, became another popular borrowing from the West. Another new type of image showed the Jharokha Darshan (literally "balcony view/worship"), or public display of the emperor to the court, or the public, which became a daily ceremonial under Akbar, Jahangir and Shah Jahan, before being stopped as un-Islamic by Aurangzeb. In these scenes, the emperor is shown at top on a balcony or at a window, with a crowd of courtiers below, sometimes including many portraits. Like the increasingly large halos these emperors were given in single portraits, the iconography reflects the aspiration of the later Mughals to project an image as the representative of Allah on earth, or even as having a quasi-divine status themselves. Other images show the enthroned emperor having meetings, receiving visitors, or in durbar, or formal council. These and royal portraits incorporated in hunting scenes became highly popular types in later Rajput painting and other post-Mughal styles.

Another popular subject area was realistic studies of animals and plants, mostly flowers; the text of the Baburnama includes a number of descriptions of such subjects, which were illustrated in the copies made for Akbar. These subjects also had specialist artists, including Ustad Mansur. Milo C. Beach argues that "Mughal naturalism has been greatly overstressed. Early animal imagery consists of variations on a theme, rather than new, innovative observations". He sees considerable borrowings from Chinese animal paintings on paper, which seem not to have been highly valued by Chinese collectors, and so reached India.

Illustrated books
In the formative period of the style, under Akbar, the imperial workshop produced a number of heavily illustrated copies of established books in Persian. One of the first, probably from the 1550s and now mostly in the Cleveland Museum of Art, was a Tutinama with some 250 rather simple and rather small miniatures, most with only a few figures. In contrast the Hamzanama Akbar commissioned had unusually large pages, of densely woven cotton rather than the usual paper, and the images were very often crowded with figures. The work was "a continuous series of romantic interludes, threatening events, narrow escapes, and violent acts", supposedly telling the life of an uncle of Muhammad. Akbar's manuscript had a remarkable total of some 1400 miniatures, one on every opening, with the relevant text written on the back of the page, presumably to be read to the emperor as he looked at each image. This colossal project took most of the 1560s, and probably beyond. These and a few other early works saw a fairly unified Mughal workshop style emerge by around 1580.

Other large projects included biographies or memoirs of the Mughal dynasty. Babur, its founder, had written classic memoirs, which his grandson Akbar had translated into Persian, as the Baburnama (1589), and then produced in four lavishly illustrated copies, with up to 183 miniatures each. The Akbarnama was Akbar's own commissioned biography or chronicle, produced in many versions, and the tradition continued with Jahangir's autobiography Tuzk-e-Jahangiri (or Jahangirnama) and a celebratory biography of Shah Jahan, called the Padshahnama, which brought the era of the large illustrated imperial biography to an end, around 1650. Akbar commissioned a copy of the Zafarnama, a biography of his distant ancestor Timur, but though he had his aunt write a biography of his father Humayun, no illustrated manuscript survives.

Volumes of the classics of Persian poetry usually had rather fewer miniatures, often around twenty, but often these were of the highest quality. Akbar also had the Hindu epic poems translated into Persian, and produced in illustrated versions. Four are known of the Razmnama, a Mahabharata in Persian, from between 1585 and c. 1617. Akbar had at least one copy of the Persian version of the Ramayana.

Origins
 
Mughal court painting, as opposed to looser variants of the Mughal style produced in regional courts and cities, drew little from indigenous non-Muslim traditions of painting. These were Hindu and Jain, and earlier Buddhist, and almost entirely religious. They existed mainly in relatively small illustrations to texts, but also mural paintings, and paintings in folk styles on cloth, in particular ones on scrolls made to be displayed by popular singers or reciters of the Hindu epics and other stories, performed by travelling specialists; very few early examples of these last survive. A vivid Kashmiri tradition of mural paintings flourished between the 9th and 17th centuries, as seen in the murals of Alchi Monastery or Tsaparang: a number of Kashimiri painters were employed by Akbar and some influence of their art can be seen in various Mughal works, such as the Hamzanama.

In contrast Mughal painting was "almost entirely secular", although religious figures were sometimes portrayed. Realism, especially in portraits of both people and animals, became a key aim, far more than in Persian painting, let alone the Indian traditions. There was already a Muslim tradition of miniature painting under the Turko-Afghan Sultanate of Delhi which the Mughals overthrew, and like the Mughals, and the very earliest of Central Asian invaders into the subcontinent, patronized foreign culture. These paintings were painted on loose-leaf paper, and were usually placed between decorated wooden covers. Although the first surviving manuscripts are from Mandu in the years either side of 1500, there were very likely earlier ones which are either lost, or perhaps now attributed to southern Persia, as later manuscripts can be hard to distinguish from these by style alone, and some remain the subject of debate among specialists. By the time of the Mughal invasion, the tradition had abandoned the high viewpoint typical of the Persian style, and adopted a more realistic style for animals and plants.

No miniatures survive from the reign of the founder of the dynasty, Babur, nor does he mention commissioning any in his memoirs, the Baburnama. Copies of this were illustrated by his descendents, Akbar in particular, with many portraits of the many new animals Babur encountered when he invaded India, which are carefully described. However some surviving un-illustrated manuscripts may have been commissioned by him, and he comments on the style of some famous past Persian masters. Some older illustrated manuscripts have his seal on them; the Mughals came from a long line stretching back to Timur and were fully assimilated into Persianate culture, and expected to patronize literature and the arts.

The style of the Mughal school developed within the royal atelier. Knowledge was primarily transmitted through familial and apprenticeship relationships, and the system of joint manuscript production which brought multiple artists together for single works. In some cases, senior artists would draw the illustrations in outline, and more junior ones would usually apply the colours, especially for background areas. Where no artist names are inscribed, it is very difficult to trace Imperial Mughal paintings back to specific artists.

Development

After a tentative start under Humayun, the great period of Mughal painting was during the next three reigns, of Akbar, Jahangir and Shah Jahan, which covered just over a century between them.

Humayun (1530–1540 and 1555–1556)

When the second Mughal emperor, Humayun was in exile in Tabriz in the Safavid court of Shah Tahmasp I of Persia, he was exposed to Persian miniature painting, and commissioned at least one work there (or in Kabul), an unusually large painting on cloth of Princes of the House of Timur, now in the British Museum. Originally a group portrait with his sons, in the next century Jahangir had it added to make it a dynastic group including dead ancestors. When Humayun returned to India, he brought two accomplished Persian artists Abd al-Samad and Mir Sayyid Ali with him. His usurping brother Kamran Mirza had maintained a workshop in Kabul, which Humayan perhaps took over into his own. Humayan's major known commission was a Khamsa of Nizami with 36 illuminated pages, in which the different styles of the various artists are mostly still apparent. Apart from the London painting, he also commissioned at least two miniatures showing himself with family members, a type of subject that was rare in Persia but common among the Mughals.

Akbar (r. 1556–1605)
During the reign of Humayun's son Akbar (r. 1556–1605), the imperial court, apart from being the centre of administrative authority to manage and rule the vast Mughal empire, also emerged as a centre of cultural excellence. Akbar inherited and expanded his father's library and atelier of court painters, and paid close personal attention to its output. He had studied painting in his youth under Abd as-Samad, though it is not clear how far these studies went.

Between 1560 and 1566 the Tutinama ("Tales of a Parrot"), now in the Cleveland Museum of Art was illustrated, showing "the stylistic components of the imperial Mughal style at a formative stage". 
Among other manuscripts, between 1562 and 1577 the atelier worked on an illustrated manuscript of the Hamzanama consisting of 1,400 cotton folios, unusually large at 69 cm x 54 cm (approx. 27 x 20 inches) in size. This huge project "served as a means of moulding the disparate styles of his artists, from Iran and from different parts of India, into one unified style". By the end, the style reached maturity, and "the flat and decorative compositions of Persian painting have been transformed by creating a believable space in which characters painted in the round can perform".

Sa'di's masterpiece The Gulistan was produced at Fatehpur Sikri in 1582, a Darab Nama around 1585; the Khamsa of Nizami (British Library, Or. 12208) followed in the 1590s and Jami's Baharistan around 1595 in Lahore. As Mughal-derived painting spread to Hindu courts the texts illustrated included the Hindu epics including the Ramayana and the Mahabharata; themes with animal fables; individual portraits; and paintings on scores of different themes. Mughal style during this period continued to refine itself with elements of realism and naturalism coming to the fore. Between 1570–1585, Akbar hired over one hundred painters to practice Mughal style painting.

Akbar's rule established a celebratory theme among the Mughal Empire. In this new period, Akbar persuaded artist to focus on showing off spectacles and including grand symbols like elephants in their work to create the sense of a prospering empire. Along with this new mindset, Akbar also encouraged his people to write down and find a way to record what they remembered from earlier times to ensure that others would be able to remember the greatness of the Mughal empire.

Jahangir (1605–1625)
Jahangir had an artistic inclination and during his reign Mughal painting developed further. Brushwork became finer and the colours lighter. Jahangir was also deeply influenced by European painting. During his reign he came into direct contact with the English Crown and was sent gifts of oil paintings, which included portraits of the King and Queen. He encouraged his royal atelier to take up the single point perspective favoured by European artists, unlike the flattened multi-layered style used in traditional miniatures. He particularly encouraged paintings depicting events of his own life, individual portraits, and studies of birds, flowers and animals. The Tuzk-e-Jahangiri (or Jahangirnama), written during his lifetime, which is an autobiographical account of Jahangir's reign, has several paintings, including some unusual subjects such as the union of a saint with a tigress, and fights between spiders. Mughal paintings made during Jahangir's reign continued the trend of Naturalism and were influenced by the resurgence of Persian styles and subjects over more traditional Hindu.

Shah Jahan (1628–1659)
During the reign of Shah Jahan (1628–58), Mughal paintings continued to develop, but court paintings became more rigid and formal. The illustrations from the "Padshanama" (chronicle of the King of the world), one of the finest Islamic manuscripts from the Royal Collection, at Windsor, were painted during the reign of Shah Jahan. Written in Persian on paper that is flecked with gold, has exquisitely rendered paintings. The "Padshahnama" has portraits of the courtiers and servants of the King painted with great detail and individuality. In keeping with the strict formality at court, however the portraits of the King and important nobles was rendered in strict profile, whereas servants and common people, depicted with individual features have been portrayed in the three-quarter view or the frontal view.

Themes including musical parties; lovers, sometimes in intimate positions, on terraces and gardens; and ascetics gathered around a fire, abound in the Mughal paintings of this period. Even though this period was titled the most prosperous, artists during this time were expected to adhere to representing life in court as organized and unified. For this reason, most art created under his rule focused mainly on the emperor and aided in establishing his authority. The purpose of this art was to leave behind an image of what the Mughal's believed to be the ideal ruler and state.

Later paintings

Aurangzeb (1658–1707) was never an enthusiastic patron of painting, largely for religious reasons  , and took a turn away from the pomp and ceremonial of the court around 1668, after which he probably commissioned no more paintings. After 1681 he moved to the Deccan to pursue his slow conquest of the Deccan Sultanates, never returning to live in the north.

Mughal paintings continued to survive, but the decline had set in. Some sources however note that a few of the best Mughal paintings were made for Aurangzeb, speculating that they believed that he was about to close the workshops and thus exceeded themselves in his behalf. There was a brief revival during the reign of Muhammad Shah 'Rangeela' (1719–48), but by the time of Shah Alam II (1759–1806), the art of Mughal painting had lost its glory. By that time, other schools of Indian painting had developed, including, in the royal courts of the Rajput kingdoms of Rajputana, Rajput painting and in the cities ruled by the British East India Company, the Company style under Western influence. Late Mughal style often shows increased use of perspective and recession under Western influence. 

Many museums have collections, with that of the Victoria and Albert Museum in London especially large.

Artists

The Persian master artists Abd al-Samad and Mir Sayyid Ali, who had accompanied Humayun to India in the 16th century, were in charge of the imperial atelier during the formative stages of Mughal painting. Many artists worked on large commissions, the majority of them apparently Hindu, to judge by the names recorded. Mughal painting generally involved a group of artists, one (generally the most senior) to decide and outline the composition, the second to actually paint, and perhaps a third who specialized in portraiture, executing individual faces.

This was especially the case with the large historical book projects that dominated production during Akbar's reign, the Tutinama, Baburnama, Hamzanama, Razmnama, and Akbarnama. For manuscripts of Persian poetry there was a different way of working, with the best masters apparently expected to produce exquisitely finished miniatures all or largely their own work. An influence on the evolution of style during Akbar's reign was Kesu Das, who understood and developed "European techniques of rendering space and volume".

Conveniently for modern scholars, Akbar liked to see the names of the artists written below each miniature. Analysis of manuscripts shows that individual miniatures were assigned to many painters. For example, the incomplete Razmnama in the British Library contains 24 miniatures, with 21 different names, though this may be an especially large number.

Other important painters under Akbar and Jahangir were:
Farrukh Beg (c. 1545– c. 1615), another Persian import, in India from 1585–1590, perhaps then in Bijapur, returning north from around 1605 to his death.
Daswanth, a Hindu, d. 1584, who worked especially on Akbar's Razmnama, the Mahabharata in Persian 
 Basawan a Hindu active c. 1580–1600, whose son Manohar Das was active c. 1582–1624
 Govardhan, active c. 1596 to 1640, another Hindu, especially good at portraits. His father Bhavani Das, had been a painter in the imperial workshop.
Ustad Mansur (flourished 1590–1624) a specialist in animals and plants
 Abu al-Hasan (1589 – c. 1630)
Bichitr
Bishandas, a Hindu specialist in portraits
Mushfiq an early example of an artist who seems never to have worked in the imperial atelier, but for other clients.
Miskin

Others: Nanha, Daulat, Payag, Abd al-Rahim, Amal-e Hashim, Keshavdas, and Mah Muhammad.

The sub-imperial school of Mughal painting included artists such as Mushfiq, Kamal, and Fazl. During the first half of the 18th century, many Mughal-trained artists left the imperial workshop to work at Rajput courts. These include artists such as Bhawanidas and his son Dalchand.

Mughal style today

Mughal-style miniature paintings are still being created today by a small number of artists in Lahore concentrated mainly in the National College of Arts. Although many of these miniatures are skillful copies of the originals, some artists have produced contemporary works using classic methods with, at times, remarkable artistic effect.

The skills needed to produce these modern versions of Mughal miniatures are still passed on from generation to generation, although many artisans also employ dozens of workers, often painting under trying working conditions, to produce works sold under the signature of their modern masters.

Gallery

See also
Arabic miniature
Indian painting
Madhubani painting
Ottoman miniature
Rajput painting
Tanjore painting
Western painting
Persian miniature
Islamic miniature
Sikh art

Notes

References
Beach, Milo Cleveland, Early Mughal painting, Harvard University Press, 1987, google books
Crill, Rosemary, and Jariwala, Kapil. The Indian Portrait, 1560–1860, National Portrait Gallery, London, 2010, 
Eastman, Alvan C. "Mughal painting." College Art Association . 3.2 (1993): 36. Web. 30 Sep. 2013.
"Grove", Oxford Art Online, "Indian sub., §VI, 4(i): Mughal ptg styles, 16th–19th centuries", restricted access.
Harle, J.C., The Art and Architecture of the Indian Subcontinent, 2nd edn. 1994, Yale University Press Pelican History of Art,  
Kossak, Steven. (1997). Indian court painting, 16th-19th century. Metropolitan Museum of Art. 
Losty, J. P. Roy, Malini (eds), Mughal India: Art, Culture and Empire, 2013, British Library, 9780712358705
"Mughal Painting." Encyclopædia Britannica. Encyclopædia Britannica Academic Online Edition. Encyclopædia Britannica Inc., 2013.Web. 30 Sep 2013.
Titley, Norah M., Persian Miniature Painting, and its Influence on the Art of Turkey and India, 1983, University of Texas Press, 0292764847
 Sarafan, Greg, "Artistic Stylistic Transmission in the Royal Mughal Atelier", Sensible Reason, LLC, 2007, SensibleReason.com

Further reading
Painting for the Mughal Emperor (The Art of the Book 1560-1660) by Susan Stronge
Fiction in Mughal Miniature Painting by Prof. P. C. Jain and Dr. Daljeet
Painting the Mughal Experience by Som Prakash Verma, 2005
Chitra, Die Tradition der Miniaturmalerei in Rajasthan by K.D. Christof & Renate Haass, 1999

 Artistic Stylistic Transmission in the Royal Mughal Atelier by Greg Sarafan, Esq., 2007

External links

Indian Court Painting, 16th-19th Century from the Metropolitan Museum of Art
National Museum, Delhi - Mughal paintings
San Diego Museum of Art
Collection: Art of the Mughal Empire from the University of Michigan Museum of Art

Schools of Indian painting
Indian painting
Islamic illuminated manuscripts
Mughal Empire
Pakistani painting
Mughal art
Islamic arts of the book

de:Mogulreich#Malerei